Psorula is a fungal genus in the family Psoraceae. It is a monotypic genus, containing the single lichen species Psorula rufonigra. The genus was circumscribed by German lichenologist Gotthard Schneider in 1980.

References

Lecanorales
Lichen genera
Lecanorales genera
Taxa described in 1980